The 1987–88 SK Rapid Wien season was the 90th season in club history.

Squad

Squad and statistics

Squad statistics

Fixtures and results

League

Cup

Supercup

European Cup

References

1987-88 Rapid Wien Season
Rapid
Austrian football championship-winning seasons